Benjamin Van Durmen (born 20 March 1997) is a Belgian footballer who plays for Liga I club FC U Craiova 1948 as a centre midfielder.

Club career
Benjamin Van Durmen started his career with Mouscron.

On 12 November 2017, Benjamin Van Durmen claimed to be there by quoting "On est la hein !! ✌🏼✌🏼" on Instagram. This made an impact on some supporters who started an unofficial BVD30 fan club.

On 10 August 2021, he signed with FC U Craiova in Romania.

References

External links

1997 births
Sportspeople from Tournai
Footballers from Hainaut (province)
Living people
Belgian footballers
Association football midfielders
Royal Excel Mouscron players
FC U Craiova 1948 players
Belgian Pro League players
Liga I players
Belgian expatriate footballers
Expatriate footballers in Romania
Belgian expatriate sportspeople in Romania